The Wittelsbach-Graff Diamond is a  deep-blue diamond with internally flawless clarity, originating in the Kollur Mine, India. Laurence Graff purchased the Wittelsbach Diamond in 2008 for £16.4 million. In 2010, Graff revealed he had had the diamond cut by three diamond cutters to remove flaws. The diamond was now more than  lighter and was renamed the Wittelsbach-Graff Diamond. There is controversy, as critics claim the recutting has so altered the diamond as to make it unrecognisable, compromising its historical integrity.

Wittelsbach Diamond

The original Wittelsbach Diamond, also known as Der Blaue Wittelsbacher, was a  fancy, deep, greyish-blue diamond with VS2 clarity that had been part of both the Austrian and the Bavarian Crown jewels.

Its colour and clarity had been compared to the Hope Diamond. It had 82 facets arranged in an atypical pattern. The star facets on the crown were vertically split, and the pavilion had sixteen needle-like facets arranged in pairs, pointing outward from the culet facet.

History

The diamond originates from the Kollur mines of Guntur District in Andhra Pradesh, India. The story that King Felipe IV of Castile purchased the jewel and included it in the dowry of his teenage daughter, Margaret Teresa, in 1664 is apocryphal.  The first time the diamond was mentioned is about fifty years later when it was already in Vienna. It was in the possession of the Habsburg family and came to Munich when, in 1722, Maria Amalia married Karl of Bavaria, a member of the Wittelsbach family.

In 1745, the Wittelsbach Diamond was first mounted on the Bavarian Elector's Order of the Golden Fleece. When Maximilian IV Joseph von Wittelsbach became the first King of Bavaria in 1806, he commissioned a royal crown that prominently displayed the diamond. Until 1918, the jewel remained on top of the Bavarian crown. It was seen last in public at Ludwig III of Bavaria's funeral in 1921.

The Wittelsbach family tried to sell the diamond in 1931 during the Great Depression but found no buyers.  It eventually sold the jewel in 1951. In 1958, the stone was exhibited at the World Expo in Brussels. In the 1960s, the Goldmuntz family asked Joseph Komkommer, a jeweller, to re-cut the diamond, but Komkommer recognised its historical significance and refused. Instead, he joined a group of dealers that bought it. The diamond had been in a private collection since 1964; Helmut Horten had presented to his wife Heidi at their wedding.

On 10 December 2008, the  Wittelsbach Diamond was sold to London-based jeweller Laurence Graff for £16.4 million sterling, or US$23.4 million, at the time the highest price ever paid at auction for a diamond. (The previous record had been held by a pear-shaped  stone named the Star of the Season.) The record was eclipsed on 16 November 2010, when a 24.78 carat pink diamond was sold for £29 million Sterling, or US$46 million, again to Mr. Graff.

In June 2011, Graff apparently sold the diamond to the former emir of Qatar, Hamad bin Khalifa, for at least US$80 million.

Alteration

Immediately following the sale, Graff announced his intention to recut the gem to remove damage to the girdle and enhance the colour.

The resulting stone has been renamed the Wittelsbach-Graff. The move was met with heavy criticism by some experts: Gabriel Tolkowsky called it "the end of culture." Shortly after the auction of the diamond, American gem cutter and replicator of famous diamonds Scott Sucher stated, "In the case of the Wittelsbach, what's at stake is at minimum over 350 years of history, as every nick, chip, and scratch has a story to tell. Just because we can't decipher these stories doesn't mean they don't exist." The alteration of the historical stone has been compared by Professor Hans Ottomeyer, director of the Deutsches Historisches Museum of Berlin, to the overpainting of a painting by Rembrandt. It is opined that the recutting was done to increase its market value and, by extension, that of other "fancy diamonds". As a result of the recut, which removed some chips and reduced the size of the culet by 40%, the gem has been re-evaluated by the Gemological Institute of America and its colour grade revised from "fancy deep grayish-blue", the same grade given by GIA to The Hope, to the more desirable "fancy deep blue". The diamond's clarity had also been revised upward from "very slightly included" (VS1) to "internally flawless" (IF).

See also
List of famous diamonds
List of individual gemstones

Further reading
 Rudolf Dröschel, Jürgen Evers, Hans Ottomeyer: The Wittelsbach Blue, in: Gems and Gemology , 44 (2008), P. 348–363
 Jürgen Evers, Leonhard Möckl, Heinrich Nöth: Der Wittelsbacher und der Hope-Diamant, in: Chemie in Unserer Zeit , 46 (2012), P. 356–364
 Wise, Richard W., Secrets of the Gem Trade, The Connoisseur's Guide To Precious gemstones,  Fancy Blue Diamonds, p. 235-236

References

External link

House of Wittelsbach
Individual diamonds
Blue diamonds
Golconda diamonds